Granåsen is a ski jumping hill, located in Granåsen Ski Centre in Trondheim, Norway. The hill frequently hosts World Cup and Continental Cup competitions arranged by FIS and also hosted the FIS Nordic World Ski Championships 1997. The hill sports one normal sized hill (K-90) and one large hill (K-124).

Before the 2008/2009 season the hill was improved, and the K-spot is now located at 124 meters while the hill size has been increased to 140 meters. The hill record belongs to Kamil Stoch, who jumped 146 m in March 2018 during the World Cup competition.

References

Sports venues in Trondheim
Ski jumping venues in Norway
Ski stadiums in Norway
Raw Air